Prison Planet may refer to:

 "Escape from the Prison Planet", a song by Clutch from the album Clutch
 Prison Planet, a 2008 album by the East Coast Avengers
 The Prison Planet, one of the primary settings of the Canadian television series Shadow Raiders
 Prisonplanet.com, a website operated by American conspiracy theorist Alex Jones
 Prison Planet Records, an American record label operated by members of the band Supagroup, which also released the band's early albums
 Salusa Secundus, a fictional planet in the Dune universe, designated the Imperial Prison Planet in the storyline
 Prison planet is the Twitter handle for Paul Joseph Watson

See also
 Penal colony